Stephanie "Golden Girl" Jaramillo (born May 18, 1982) is a former professional boxer. She has been inducted into the Amateur Athletic World Hall of Fame Museum for Outstanding Boxing Achievement.

Childhood
Stephanie "Golden Girl" Jaramillo is a native of the South Valley located in Albuquerque, New Mexico. She became attracted to boxing from seeing a Mike Tyson fight at her grandparents’ house. In her adolescence Jaramillo sparred neighborhood kids, but her father would not allow her to train at boxing until he had seen a female boxing bout on TV, which finally happened when Jaramillo was 14. She had her first amateur fight two and a half months later (a knockout).

Early career
Jaramillo had over 40 amateur bouts. She won the junior division in the New Mexico state amateur championships in 1996 and 1997. In 1998 she won a silver medal in the junior division of the Women's National Championships. She placed in two other competitions in 1999, and achieved a gold medal in the 1999 Everlast National PAL Championships, defeating future pro boxers Andrea Nelson and Kelly Whaley, both by 5-0 decisions.

In 2000, she competed in dual meets on the USA Women's Amateur Boxing Team, once against Canada, and twice against Russia. She earned a silver medal in all three meets.

Highlights of Jaramillo's amateur career:

1996 – State Champion-Junior Division
1997 - State Champion – Junior Division
1997 – Junior Olympics Champion
1997 – Silver Gloves Champion – Junior Division
1997 – Golden Gloves Champion – Junior Division
1998 – State Champion – Junior Division
1998 – Junior Olympics Champion
1998 – Silver Gloves Champion- Junior Division
1998 – Silver Gloves Champion – Junior Division
1998 – Golden Gloves Champion – Junior Division
1998 – Women's National Championships-Junior Division, Silver Medalist
1999 – Everlast Women's National Championships – Open Division, Bronze Medalist
1999 – Ringside Women's National Golden Gloves – Open Division, Silver Medalist
1999 – Everlast National PAL Championships – Open Division, Gold Medalist (Defeated, now pro-boxers, Andrea Nelson and Kelly Whaley, both 5-0 decision)
2000 – Everlast Women's Nationals – Bronze Medalist
2000 – USA vs. Canada – Silver Medalist
2000 – USA vs. Russia Dual – Silver Medalist (Nov. 15)
2000 – USA vs. Russia Dual – Silver Medalist (Nov. 17)
As an amateur Stephanie's strength trainer was Koeth Jardine

Professional career

Jaramillo made her pro debut on June 29, 2002. She had seven professional bouts.

On December 3, 2004, she fought Sumya Anani, who at the time held the WIBA, IFBA, IBA, and GBU titles. Jaramillo went the distance but lost by decision.

Retirement
Jaramillo announced her retirement on May 10, 2005. She remains active in boxing management and training. She was inducted into the Amateur Athletic World Hall of Fame Museum for Outstanding Boxing Achievement.

Jaramillo is Vice President of her family company, AmeriStar Construction, Inc. She says, "If not for the sweat and tears and hard work of my mother and father, the company would not be where it is today." Now President Ricky Jaramillo, his wife Angela Jaramillo, and Stephanie run the business

Outside of the ring
Stephanie Jaramillo is happily retired from boxing. On March 22, 2008 Stephanie gave birth to A healthy baby boy Dominic 8Lbs 2oz 22 inches .  Stephanie currently lives in Albuquerque where she Lives a private life outside of the ring but can be found at many charity events she hold close to her heart .  
Jaramillo is still a youth spokesperson for the “Jump Rope for Heart”, having participated in the last few years with the local community. She also speaks at local schools on career days, telling students to “Stay Off Drugs, “Eat Healthy, and to “Always Follow Your Dreams”.

Stephanie promoted her first boxing show at the Santa Ana Star Casino in Bernalillo, New Mexico. The local news media billed it as a major success.  An all female boxing card is in the works for her second show.

Professional record at a glance

2002

June 28, 2002 - Santa Ana, Bernalillo, NM - Martha Flores - TKO 2
March-15-2002- Acoma Angie Poe UD 4

2003

May-23-2003 - Albuquerque - Mimi Palfy TKO 1
August 26-2003- Albuquerque Holly Holm Majority Decision 4
October-3-2003- Albuquerque Holly Holm DRAW 6

2004

February 24, 2004, Bernalillo, NM Imelda Arias UD 6
December 3, 2004 - Kansas City, MO Sumya Anani UD 10 WIBA World Jr. Welterweight title

Professional boxing record

Notes

References
 Golden Girl Promotions
 Golden Girl Boxing Official Site
 Women's Boxing Archive Network
 New Mexico Boxing
 Eastside Boxing
 Women Boxing

External links
  - Official Website

1982 births
Living people
American women boxers
Boxers from Albuquerque, New Mexico
Welterweight boxers
21st-century American women